Carmen Jr. is a 1923 American silent short comedy film from 1923 starring Baby Peggy and directed by Alfred Goulding. The film is about 11 minutes in length. A foreign copy of the film exists with English subtitles.

References

External links

1923 films
American silent short films
American black-and-white films
1920s American films